Charles H. Whitebread (April 2, 1943 – September 16, 2008) was the George T. Pfleger Professor of Law at the University of Southern California Law School.  He was an authority on criminal law and criminal procedure, writing and lecturing on those and other subjects throughout the United States.

Early life
Whitebread was born on April 2, 1943, in Montgomery County, Maryland. He attended Princeton University (1965), where he was an honors graduate,  and Yale Law School (1968), where he was an editor for the Yale Law Journal.

Academic career
After briefly working at Wilmer Cutler & Pickering, he became a professor at the University of Virginia School of Law, where he taught for 13 years, and then moved to the University of Southern California Law School.

Whitebread was also a lecturer in criminal law and criminal procedure for BarBri. He was very popular with BarBri students, who have started Facebook groups in appreciation of his unique and humorous lectures.

It is believed that Whitebread taught more law students than any other professor in the country due to his long service and the nationwide publication of his criminal law and procedure lectures. It is also thought that Whitebread instructed more police officers than any other instructor in modern history through his long years as an instructor at the FBI school at Quantico.

Whitebread gave the keynote speech at the American Psychology and Law Society (APLS) Annual Conference in Jacksonville, Florida on March 6, 2008.

Writings
Whitebread was a prolific legal writer, who published a dozen books and over 30 law review articles, which includes Criminal Procedure, Children in the Legal System, The Eight Secrets of Top Exam Performance in Law School, and co-authored The Forbidden Fruit and the Tree of Knowledge: An Inquiry into the Legal History of American Marijuana Prohibition (http://www.druglibrary.org/schaffer/LIBRARY/studies/vlr/vlrtoc.htm) in the 1970 Virginia Law Review (Vol. 56 OCT. 1970 NUMBER 6) which became the seminal work for The Marihuana Conviction originally published in 1974. (http://product.half.ebay.com/The-Marihuana-Conviction-A-History-of-Marihuana-Prohibition-in-the-United-States-by-Richard-J-Bonnie-and-Charles-H-Whitebread-1974-Book-Illustrated/1599039) Dave 09:12, 17 May 2012 (UTC)

References

External links
 rcf.usc.edu
Announcement of Whitebread's death from Above The Law
Eulogy for Charles Whitebread by Susan Estrich

1940s births
2008 deaths
American legal scholars
Princeton University alumni
University of Southern California faculty
University of Virginia School of Law faculty
Yale Law School alumni
People from Montgomery County, Maryland
Wilmer Cutler Pickering Hale and Dorr people